Monida Pass is a high mountain pass in the northern Rocky Mountains of the western United States, at an elevation of  above sea level on Interstate 15, and  on the Union Pacific Railroad.

On the Continental Divide in the Bitterroot Range, it marks the transition between the Beaverhead Mountains and the Centennial Mountains.  Its name is derived from the states that it separates, "Mon" from Montana and "-ida" from Idaho.

The pass forms part of the border between eastern Idaho and southwestern Montana, and is between the towns of Spencer in Clark County and Lima in Beaverhead County.  On the Idaho side is Beaver Creek running through Beaver Canyon, which was the route of the Utah and Northern Railway in 1880 and is still used by Union Pacific.

In the late 19th century, stagecoaches ferried tourists from the railroad at Monida Pass to Yellowstone National Park, until UP built a branch line to the park over Reas Pass. Interstate 15, the "Veterans Memorial Highway," runs through the pass and north to the international boundary with Canada at Sweetgrass.

See also
 Mountain passes in Montana

References 

 
 Idaho: A Climbing Guide - 76. Retrieved 4 March 2007.
 USDA Forest Service - Beaverhead-Deerlodge National Forest -  - . Retrieved 4 March 2007.
 Idaho Museum of Natural History - Digital Atlas of Idaho - "A Brief Introduction to Idaho." Retrieved 4 March 2007.

External links
Montana Dept. of Transportation - webcam - Monida Pass

Mountain passes of Idaho
Mountain passes of Montana
Landforms of Beaverhead County, Montana
Landforms of Clark County, Idaho
Rail mountain passes of the United States
Great Divide of North America
Borders of Idaho
Borders of Montana
Transportation in Beaverhead County, Montana
Transportation in Clark County, Idaho